844 Leontina, provisional designation 1916 AP, is a stony asteroid from the outer region of the asteroid belt, about 36 kilometers in diameter. It was discovered on 1 October 1916, by Austrian astronomer Joseph Rheden at Vienna Observatory, Austria.

Description 

Leontina is an X-type asteroid in the SMASS classification. It orbits the Sun at a distance of 3.0–3.4 AU once every 5 years and 9 months (2,097 days). Its orbit is tilted by 9 degrees to the plane of the ecliptic and shows an eccentricity of 0.07.

Multiple lightcurve analysis rendered a well-defined, concurring rotation period of 6.79 hours. According to the surveys carried out by the Japanese Akari satellite and the U.S. Wide-field Infrared Survey Explorer with its subsequent NEOWISE mission, measurements of the body's brightness gave a divergent albedo of 0.13, 0.20 and 0.31, respectively. As a result, the asteroid's estimated diameter strongly varies between 28 and 40 kilometers. The Collaborative Asteroid Lightcurve Link (CALL) considers Akari's albedo-figure of 0.20 the most accurate one and consequently assumes the otherwise classified X-type body to be of a stony surface composition with a calculated diameter of 36 kilometers.

This minor planet was named by the discoverer for his home town Lienz in East Tyrol, Austria.

References

External links 
 The Asteroid Veritas: An intruder in a family named after it?
 Asteroid Lightcurve Database (LCDB), query form (info )
 Dictionary of Minor Planet Names, Google books
 Asteroids and comets rotation curves, CdR – Observatoire de Genève, Raoul Behrend
 Discovery Circumstances: Numbered Minor Planets (1)-(5000) – Minor Planet Center
 
 

000844
Discoveries by Joseph Rheden
Named minor planets
000844
19161001